Hammer Battalion is the ninth studio album by the Swedish death metal band Unleashed. It was recorded at Fredrik Folkare's recording studio in Sweden and released on June 9, 2008, by Steamhammer (a division of SPV records). A music video was shot for Black Horizon, and it debuted on MTV Headbangers blog.

Track listing

Personnel
 Johnny Hedlund – vocals, bass
 Fredrik Folkare – lead guitar
 Tomas Måsgard – rhythm guitar
 Anders Schultz – drums

References

External links
  Unleashed Homepage

Unleashed (band) albums
2008 albums
SPV/Steamhammer albums